August Is a Wicked Month is the fourth novel by Edna O'Brien. It was published in 1965.

The New York Times claims it featured "one of the best author photographs of the 20th century." That cover was reprinted on the cover of her 2012 memoir Country Girl.

Upon publication August Is a Wicked Month, as with most of O'Brien's early books, was banned in several jurisdictions, including by Ireland's strict Catholic rulers.

The title is regularly mentioned to this day by commentators on topics ranging from business and politics to fashion and weather.

References

External links
 A Way Back to Life, 6 June 1965, Eliot Fremont-Smith

1965 novels
Book censorship in the Republic of Ireland
Novels by Edna O'Brien
20th-century Irish novels
Censored books
Jonathan Cape books